The 2014–15 New Zealand V8 season was the sixteenth season of the series, under the NZV8 guise. The season began at the Hampton Downs Motorsport Park on 1–2 November 2014 and finished at the Pukekohe Park Raceway on 11–12 April after six championship meetings. Nick Ross was the reigning TLX champion, and whilst James McLaughlin won the TL Championship, graduated into the TLX class to battle for the title. The TLX Championship eventually was won by Jason Bargwanna and the TL Championship was won by Kevin Williams.

Teams and drivers

Calendar

Driver Standings

References

External links
 

V8
V8
NZ Touring Cars Championship seasons